Jayanarayan Mishra is an Indian politician and Member of Odisha Legislative Assembly from Sambalpur Assembly constituency who is serving as Opposition Leader of Odisha Legislative Assembly from 20 July 2022. He is four time Member of the Legislative Assembly from Sambalpur Assembly constituency.

Personal life 
He was born on 10 June 1963.

References 

Living people
Odisha MLAs 2000–2004
Bharatiya Janata Party politicians from Odisha
People from Sambalpur district
Odisha MLAs 2004–2009
Odisha MLAs 2009–2014
Odisha MLAs 2019–2024
1963 births